The 2001 Scott Tournament of Hearts Canadian women's national curling championship, was played at the Sudbury Community Arena in Sudbury, Ontario. The final pitted 1999 champions Colleen Jones and her Nova Scotia team against the defending champions Kelley Law who represented Team Canada. The game came down to the final shot, and a measurement to decide the winner.

Teams

Standings

Results

Draw 1

Draw 2

Draw 3

Draw 4

Draw 5

Draw 6

Draw 7

Draw 8

Draw 9

Draw 10

Draw 11

Draw 12

Draw 13

Draw 14

Draw 15

Draw 16

Draw 17

Tiebreaker

Page playoffs

1 vs. 2

3 vs. 4

Semi-final

Final

References

Scotties Tournament of Hearts
Scott Tournament of Hearts
Curling competitions in Greater Sudbury
2001 in Ontario
2001 in women's curling
February 2001 sports events in Canada